Stamford and Rutland Hospital is an elective care hospital in Stamford, Lincolnshire administered by North West Anglia NHS Foundation Trust.

History

The hospital was built on a site previously occupied by Greyfriars, Stamford and donated by the Marquess of Exeter. It was funded by a bequest from the will of surgeon Henry Fryer, designed by John Peter Gandy and opened in 1828.

Between 1876 and 1879 the hospital was expanded with the addition of three fever ward blocks, under architect Edward Browning with input from surgeon Dr William Newman. The wards incorporated a number of features such as centralised ward interiors and glazed internal walling, and were cited as an exemplar of single-block planning for small hospitals, particular by Henry Burdett. The fever wards are Grade II listed and are a testament to how voluntary hospitals dealt with nineteenth century epidemics of contagious disease.

A substantial redevelopment of the hospital was completed in July 2017, which included new imaging facilities, including a permanent MRI scanning suite, and cancer treatment facilities.

Services
The hospital provides a minor injuries unit, large scale outpatient services and day-case surgery, with the largest pain management centre in the region. It also has a medicine for the elderly ward with 22 intermediate care beds. The trust's largest hospital, Peterborough City Hospital, provides the majority of emergency and inpatient services in the area; the two together thus provide a comprehensive suite of services in a predominantly "hot" and "cold" split. It was rated "good" by the Care Quality Commission in May 2014.

References

External links
 

NHS hospitals in England
Hospitals in Lincolnshire
Health in Lincolnshire
Buildings and structures in Stamford, Lincolnshire